Newport is the county town of the Isle of Wight, an island county off the south coast of England. The town is slightly north of the centre of the island, and is in the civil parish of Newport and Carisbrooke. It has a quay at the head of the navigable section of the River Medina, which flows northwards to Cowes and the Solent. In 2020 it had an estimated population of 26,109.

History

Mousterian remains, featuring tools made by Neanderthals at least 40,000 years ago, were found at Great Pan Farm in the 1970s.

There are signs of Roman settlement in the area, which was probably known as Medina. They include two known Roman villas, one of which, Newport Roman Villa, has been excavated and opened to the public.

Information on the area resumes after the Norman Conquest. The first charter was granted in the late 12th century. In 1377 an invading French force burnt down much of the town while attempting to take Carisbrooke Castle, then under the command of Sir Hugh Tyrill. A group of Frenchmen were captured and killed, then buried in a tumulus later nicknamed Noddies Hill, a "noddy" being medieval slang for a body. This was later corrupted to Nodehill, the present name for a part of central Newport – a name that seems inappropriate, as the area is flat.

In 1648 Charles I and a group of Parliamentary Commissioners concluded the Treaty of Newport, an attempt to reach a compromise in the Civil War that was undermined by Charles's negotiations with the French and Scots to intervene on his behalf. The Treaty was repudiated by Oliver Cromwell upon returning from defeating the Scots at the Battle of Preston. This led to Charles's execution.

The town had been incorporated as a borough in 1608. The town's position as an area of trade accessible to the sea meant it rapidly took over from nearby Carisbrooke as the main central settlement, eventually absorbing the latter as a suburb. The borough ceased to exist in 1974 when it was incorporated into the larger Borough of Medina, which was itself superseded in 1995 by a single unitary authority covering the whole of the Isle of Wight.

The Drill hall in Newport opened as the headquarters of the Isle of Wight Rifle Volunteers in 1860.

Newport since the 1960s has acquired new shopping facilities and a pedestrianised central square. Through road traffic has ceased in many of the narrow streets. Newport Quay has been redeveloped with art galleries such as the Quay Arts Centre, and new flats converted from old warehouses.

The Queen Victoria Memorial was designed by local architect Percy Stone (1856–1934).

Geography

Geographically located in the centre of the Isle of Wight, at 50.701°N, 1.2883°W, Newport is the principal town on the island. It has public transport connections with all the island's major towns. It serves as the island's main shopping centre and location for public services. The main A3020 and A3054 roads converge as Medina Way between the busy roundabouts at Coppins Bridge and St Mary's Hospital.

Newport railway station was the hub of the Island's rail network until the mid-20th century, but closed in 1966. The site is now occupied by the dual-carriageway A3020 Medina Way.

More locally, Ryde, the island's largest town, is to the north-east. Sandown and Shanklin are to the east and Cowes to the north.

The River Medina runs through Newport. North of its confluence with the Lukely Brook at the town's quay, it becomes a navigable tidal estuary.

Distance from surrounding settlements
Cowes – 4.5 miles, 7 km
East Cowes – 5 miles, 8 km
Ryde – 7 miles, 11 km
Shanklin – 9 miles, 15 km
Sandown – 10 miles, 16 km
Ventnor – 11 miles, 18 km
Yarmouth, Isle of Wight – 10 miles, 16 km

Prisons
The town's suburb of Parkhurst houses two Category B men's prisons:  Parkhurst Prison and Albany. Together they make up HMP Isle of Wight, which is one of the largest prisons in the UK. Parkhurst and Albany were once among the few top-security prisons in the United Kingdom. Camp Hill was another prison in the area, but it closed in 2013.

Amenities

Seaclose Park in Newport, on the east bank of the River Medina, has since 2002 been the location for the revived Isle of Wight Music Festival, which is held once a year. Newport is home to the Postal Museum, possibly the largest private collection of vintage postal equipment and post boxes in the world.

Newport bus station is the town's central bus terminus. It acts as the hub of the Southern Vectis network, with routes from across the Island terminating there.

Sport
St George's Park is the home of Newport Football Club, the most successful of the Island's football teams, currently play in the Wessex League. The stadium has a capacity of 3,000. In 2018, an application was approved unanimously by the Isle of Wight council for a new stadium off the racecourse roundabout near Newport. This will be the new stadium for Newport (IW) F.C., so that St George's Park can be turned into an out-of-town retail area. The town is also represented by Newport Cricket Club, which plays at Victoria recreation ground. Its two teams compete in Harwoods Renault Divisions 1 and 2. The Isle of Wight County Cricket Ground is located at Newclose, on the outskirts of the town.

Schools
The town of Newport and the adjoining village of Carisbrooke together have seven primary schools, three secondary schools, a sixth-form campus, a further education college and two special schools. The primary schools located close to the town centre are Newport C of E Primary and Nine Acres Community Primary. Barton Primary is on Pan estate, while Summerfields Primary is nearby on the Staplers estate, both to the east of the town. Hunnyhill Primary is situated in Forest Road to the north of the town. There are two primary schools in Carisbrooke: Carisbrooke C of E Primary in Wellington Road and St Thomas of Canterbury Catholic Primary in the High Street, in the village centre.

The three secondary schools are Carisbrooke College, Medina College and Christ the King College. Carisbrooke College is located on a large site on the outskirts of Carisbrooke village, whilst Christ the King is just down the road, occupying two former middle school sites on opposite sides of Wellington Road. Medina College is situated to the east of the town, just off Fairlee Road, along with Medina Leisure Centre and Medina Theatre. The Island Innovation VI Form Campus is the joint sixth form for the Carisbrooke and Medina colleges. It is located in the town centre, on the site of the former Nodehill Middle School.

The Isle of Wight College stands to the north of the town centre, close to St Mary's Roundabout and the large industrial estate. Medina House School is located between Pan and Staplers, and St Georges School to the south of the town in the suburban Watergate Road.

Governance

Parliamentary representation

From the Middle Ages the Parliamentary Borough of Newport had two seats in the House of Commons. Between 1807 and 1811 they were held by two future prime ministers: Arthur Wellesley, later to become the Duke of Wellington (who was also elected to two other seats at the same time) and Henry John Temple, 3rd Viscount Palmerston. Palmerston was eligible as an MP because his late father did not convert his Irish peerage into a United Kingdom peerage, which would have confined him to the House of Lords. The local patron arranging the deal was Sir Leonard Holmes, who made it a condition that they never visited the borough.

The borough was also represented by two other future prime ministers in the 1820s. George Canning was MP for Newport when appointed Prime Minister in 1827. However, under the law as it then stood, a minister accepting office automatically vacated his seat and had to stand for re-election to the Commons, and Canning chose to stand at Seaford, a government pocket borough in Sussex, rather than fight Newport again. However, in the by-election that followed at Newport, the town elected the Hon. William Lamb, later 2nd Viscount Melbourne, whose father had also represented the borough in the 1790s. However, Lamb remained MP for Newport for only two weeks, before also being elected for Bletchingley, which he preferred to represent.

Newport's representation in Parliament was cut to one seat in 1867 and abolished altogether as a separate constituency in 1885. It now belongs to the Isle of Wight constituency.

Local council

Newport has had a variety of local government administrations.
Until 1974 Newport had its own local authority, Newport Borough Council, which until 1967 was based at Newport Guildhall.
In 1974–1995 Newport was under Medina Borough Council.
In 1995 this was abolished and the Isle of Wight Council, based at County Hall, took over responsibility. Newport remained unparished until 2008.
Newport Town Management Committee was established in April 2006 by the Isle of Wight Council as an interim body for the town until the Government gave approval for a parish or town council. The Management Committee had no formal powers and was technically no more than an advisory committee to the Isle of Wight Council. However, it was treated as a transitional authority, which acted in many ways as a town or parish council.
The first election to Newport Parish Council occurred on 1 May 2008.

Notable people
In birth order:
Elizabeth Stuart (1635–1650), daughter of Charles I and Henrietta Maria, is buried at St. Thomas' Church.
Edward Vernon Utterson (1775–1856), lawyer, was one of Six Clerks in Chancery, an antiquary and an editor.
Sarah Elizabeth Utterson (1781–1851), translator and author.
Charlotte Anley (1796–1893), novelist and songwriter, lived in the town in the mid-1820s.
William Buckler (1814–1884), portrait artist and entomologist, was born and lived here, and died in Lumley, near Emsworth.
Maxwell Gray (Mary Gleed Tuttiett, 1846–1923), novelist and poet
Westmore Family, prominent family in Hollywood make-up
Craig Douglas (born 1941), pop singer of the late 1950s and early 1960s
Geoffrey Hughes (1944–2012), actor
Tony Howe (born 1947), club steward.
Anthony Minghella (1954–2008), film director
Phill Jupitus (born 1962), comedian
Kelly Sotherton (born 1976), heptathlete
Darren Mew (born 1979), breast-stroke swimmer
Lewis Buxton (born 1983), footballer with Bolton Wanderers
Gary Silk (born 1984), footballer
David Griffiths (born 1985), cricketer
Chris Russell (born 1989), cricketer
Danny Briggs (born 1991), cricketer
Keegan Brown (born 1992), professional darts player

See also 
 Church of St John the Baptist
 St Paul's Church

Notes

External links 

Newport Guide

 
Towns on the Isle of Wight
County towns in England
Ports and harbours of the Isle of Wight